The real was the currency of Colombia until 1837. No subdivisions of the real existed until after the real had ceased to be the primary unit of currency. However, 8 reales = 1 peso and 16 reales = 1 escudo.

History
Until 1820, Colombia used the Spanish colonial real, some of which were minted in Bogotá and Popayán. After 1820, issues were made specifically for Colombia, under the various names that the state used. In 1837, the peso, worth 8 reales, became the primary unit of currency. The real continued to circulate as an eighth of a peso until 1847, when a new real was introduced worth one tenth of a peso and subdivided into 10 decimos de real. This new real was renamed the decimo in 1853, although coins denominated in reales were again issued 1859-1862 and in 1880.

Coins
During the war of independence, regional issues were made by royalists in Popayán and Santa Marta, and by republicans in Cartagena and Cundinamarca. Cundinamarca went on to issue silver , 1, 2 and 8 reales between 1820 and 1823.

Banknotes
These were followed, some time in the 1820s, by notes for 1, 2, 3 and 5 pesos.

References

Modern obsolete currencies
History of Colombia
Finance in Colombia
1837 disestablishments